Madhḥaj is a large Qahtanite Arab tribal confederation. It is located in south and central Arabia. This confederation participated in the early Muslim conquests and was a major factor in the conquest of the Persian empire and the Iberian Peninsula. It is also found in Mosel, Levant, and the Iberian Peninsula.

According to some reports, the Islamic prophet Muhammad said that many people in Paradise will be from Madhḥaj. They were described as being the noblest in nature amongst the Arabs, holding up the virtues Islam holds dear. Those of honour, bravery, valour, courage, justice, wisdom, chivalry, reasoning and humility.

al-Hamdani cited Madhhaj 30 times in his book "Sifat Jazirat al Arab: Description of the Arabian Peninsula" as a Genuine Arabic dynasty with branches like Nukha, Zubaid, Ruha and Hada (best archers among the Arabs) that has famous Historical personalities such as the Arabian knight king of Yemen Amru bin Ma'adi Yakrib al-Zubaidi al-Madhhaji who became a Muslim and Malik Ashtar al-Nakh'ei a close friend of the Prophet Muhammad and a military leader with Ali ibn Abi Talib in the battle of Siffin, and Madhhaj later fought the Qarmatians under leadership of Abul Ashira in Yemen and Malik ibn Marara a-Rahawi, and the commentaries on al-Hamdani's book shows that they still live in the same towns and places as Hamadani described them in his book dated 900 AD, 1100 years ago.

Madhhaj is mentioned in Namara inscription, a memorial of the Nasrid king of al-Hira Imru ’al-Qays bin ‘Amr (died in 328), “king of all the Arabs”, boasted of having launched a raid against Madhhaj, reaching “Najran" city of Shammar (the Himyarite king Shammar Yahri'sh)
. The same story is mentioned in detail in Wahb ibn Munabbih in his book of Pre-Islamic saga and lore "The Book of The Crowns of Himyar Kings"

Before Islam, Madhhaj had its own Idol that they used to bring in the yearly pilgrimage to Kaaba before Islam (Pagan Arabs before Islam) and they used to make Talbiya specific to Madhhaj for that Idol in which they encircle Kaaba several times and plead their Madhhaj' Talbiya to Allah to let that Idol be put around the Kaaba. The Arabs are said to inherited Kaaba from Ibrahim who named it Beit Allah, (aka the house of God) but in much later ages they started worshipping idols and then they brought the idols to Kaaba to bless their Idols by God.

Madhhaj name was found in the Namara inscription dated 330 AD.

The men of Madhhaj were described as being hardened and experienced warriors in praising their positive aspect. They were also known for their skills in horse-riding and were famed for being the best archers when on a horse.  Later, after the establishment of Kufa garrison city, the Madhhij clan, including their most famous chieftain Amr ibn Ma'adi Yakrib, settled in Kufa.

References

Tribes of Arabia
Yemeni tribes
Tribes of Syria
Semitic-speaking peoples
Qahtanites
Confederations